Alexander Ruckstuhl (born 27 September 1971, in Kloten) is a Swiss rower.  He finished 4th in the men's quadruple sculls at the 1992 Summer Olympics.

References 
 
 

Rowers at the 1992 Summer Olympics
1971 births
Living people
Swiss male rowers
Olympic rowers of Switzerland

World Rowing Championships medalists for Switzerland